The 2012–13 season is the 6th season in the Football League played by Dagenham & Redbridge F.C., an English football club based in Dagenham, Greater London. It is their second consecutive season in Football League Two after relegation from Football League One in 2011. The season covers the period from 1 July 2012 to 30 June 2013.

League table
Twenty-four teams contest the division: 18 sides remaining in the division from last season, four relegated from League One, and two promoted from Conference National.

Match results
League positions are sourced from Statto, while the remaining contents of each table are sourced from the references in the "Ref" column.

League Two

FA Cup

League Cup

Football League Trophy

Player details

Numbers in parentheses denote appearances as substitute.
Players with names struck through and marked  left the club during the playing season.
Players with names in italics and marked * were on loan from another club for the whole of their season with Dagenham & Redbridge.
Players listed with no appearances have been in the matchday squad but only as unused substitutes.
Key to positions: GK – Goalkeeper; DF – Defender; MF – Midfielder; FW – Forward

Transfers

In

Out

Loans in

Loans out

References

2012-13
2012–13 Football League Two by team